Komlenac  is a village in the municipality of Kozarska Dubica, Republika Srpska, Bosnia and Herzegovina.

Notable people
Milan Tepić (the last person awarded the Order of the People's Hero) was born in the village

References

Populated places in Dubica, Bosnia and Herzegovina